John Leibbrandt (14 March 1920 – 15 May 1996) was a South African cricketer. He played in 31 first-class matches between 1939/40 and 1951/52.

See also
 List of Eastern Province representative cricketers

References

External links
 

1920 births
1996 deaths
South African cricketers
Eastern Province cricketers
Rhodesia cricketers
Cricketers from Johannesburg